Terminally redundant DNA is DNA that contains repeated sequences at each end called terminal repeats. These ends are used (e.g. in virus T4) to join the ends of the linear DNA to form a cyclic DNA. The term was first coined by Dr. Michael London in 1964.

References 

Repetitive DNA sequences